Givira basiplaga is a moth in the family Cossidae. It is found in Guyana.

References

Givira
Moths described in 1905